In popular music, interpolation (also called a replayed sample) refers to using a melody—or portions of a melody (often with modified lyrics)—from a previously recorded song but re-recording the melody instead of sampling it. Interpolation is often used when the artist or label who owns the piece of music declines to license the sample, or if licensing the piece of music is considered too costly.

Interpolation examples

Interpolation is prevalent in many genres of popular music; early examples are the Beatles interpolating "La Marseillaise" and "She Loves You", among three other interpolations in the 1967 song "All You Need Is Love", and Lyn Collins interpolating lyrics from the 5 Royales' "Think" in her similarly titled 1972 song "Think (About It)".

One genre where interpolating (as well as sampling) is highly prevalent is hip hop music; prominent examples include Stevie Wonder's "Pastime Paradise" interpolated in Coolio's hit song "Gangsta's Paradise", and Sting's "Shape of My Heart" interpolated in Juice WRLD's 2018 hit "Lucid Dreams".

In pop music, notable examples include Anne-Marie's "2002" which interpolates lyrics from six songs, Portugal. The Man's "Feel It Still" which interpolates the Marvelettes' 1961 hit "Please Mr. Postman" and "Bad Liar" by Selena Gomez which interpolates the bassline of "Psycho Killer" by new wave band Talking Heads.

The 1992 song "Murder She Wrote" by reggae duo Chaka Demus & Pliers has been interpolated in Omarion and Chris Brown's "Post to Be", in Pitbull's "El Taxi", in Jason Derulo's "Too Hot" and in the remix version of Black Eyed Peas' "Ritmo" featuring Jaden Smith, among many other songs.

See also
 Cover version
 List of interpolated songs
 Interpolation (classical music)
 Musical quotation

References

External links
 WhoSampled – a user-generated database of interpolations and samples in all types of music, as well as covers and remixes

Musical techniques